Issa Bah (born 5 July 2002) is a professional footballer who plays as a winger for Italian  club Venezia. Born in Guinea, he is a youth international for Luxembourg.

Club career
Bah began his senior career with the Luxembourgian club RM Hamm Benfica in 2018, before moving to Progrès Niederkorn in 2019. He joined Venezia on loan for the 2021–22 Serie A, signing on transfer deadline day on 31 August 2021. He made his professional debut with Venezia in a 3–1 Serie A loss to Atalanta on 23 April 2022, coming on as a late sub in the 81st minute. At the time he was the first Luxembourgish player of the Serie A.

On 28 May 2022, Bah moved to Venezia on a permanent basis.

International career
Born in Guinea, Bah moved to Luxembourg at the age of 15. He debuted for the Luxembourg U16s in a 4–3 friendly win over the Belgium U16s on 9 November 2017, scoring a brace in the win.

References

External links
 
 
 

2002 births
Living people
Luxembourgian footballers
Luxembourg youth international footballers
Guinean footballers
Guinean emigrants to Luxembourg
Association football wingers
FC RM Hamm Benfica players
FC Progrès Niederkorn players
Venezia F.C. players
Luxembourg National Division players
Serie A players
Luxembourgian expatriate footballers
Luxembourgian expatriate sportspeople in Italy
Guinean expatriate footballers
Guinean expatriates in Italy
Expatriate footballers in Italy